Vénera Kastrati is an Albanian contemporary artist.

Her work was included in a charity auction at the Museo Marino Marini in Florence in 2011, and was shown at the twenty-fifth Alexandria Biennial in Egypt in 2009–2010.

References

Further reading 
 "Blood and Honey, Future's in the Balkans", Sammlung Essl, Art of the Present, "Blut & Honig, Kunst der Gegenwart". Exhibition catalogue
 "Sound & Vision" Palazzo della Penna, Perugia, Bologna, Damiani Editore, 2006. – 268 p. 29 cm. Exhibition catalogue
 "Double Bind" Casa Masaccio. Exhibition catalogue 
 "The road to contemporary art, Mediterranean" Roma, Edition arte'm Napoli. Exhibition catalogue
 "The balcans, a crossroad to the future", Compositori IND. Grafiche Group, Arte Fiera Bologna Edition. Exhibition catalogue
 "Colours of Albania", Print Mali Pleshti Edition. Exhibition catalogue
 "We love Italy, Italy loves us", Giancarlo Politi Editor. Exhibition catalogue
 "Venice Biennale", Fare Mondi, Making Worlds, 53° Venice Biennale. Exhibition catalogue
 "Terna Prize 01" for contemporary art, Silvana Edition 
 "Beyond Materia – 53° Venice Biennale" DDN 161 Design Diffusion News, pag. 152 (ISSN 1120-9720)

Living people
Contemporary artists
Multimedia artists
Venera Kastrati
1975 births
Brera Academy alumni